The Canadian Centre for Gender and Sexual Diversity (CCGSD) is a charitable organization whose programming works to stop bullying, discrimination and homophobia in schools and communities in Canada, and abroad. Through workshops, presentations, training conferences, and by supporting youth initiatives, they engage youth in celebrating diversity of gender identity, gender expression, and romantic orientation and/or sexual orientation.

Overview
The CCGSD, originally known as Jer's Vision, was founded by a six-member board in 2005.  Started originally as a scholarship, the organization grew to a range of programs that engage schools in examining the culture of their school and providing them with programming to address challenges around bullying, homophobia, transphobia and discrimination.

In March 2015, Jer's Vision changed its name to the Canadian Centre for Gender and Sexual Diversity.

Focus areas

Programming in Schools
The Canadian Centre for Gender and Sexual Diversity works with schools to develop and provide programming that engages students, staff and community to understand bullying, discrimination, homophobia and transphobia. This includes presentations, workshops, conferences, training, professional development and efforts that support youth initiatives and clubs. The organization works across Canada, especially in rural communities, and in the Northern United States.

Working in Communities
In 2007, youth from Jer's Vision were inspired by David Shepherd and Travis Price to start the International Day of Pink.  The initiative supports youth actions to stop bullying in schools and communities.  In 2012, over 8 million people participate in the International Day of Pink.

The organization sits on a variety of committees and contributes to work across Canada. They have participated in activism and activities with the Parliament of Canada, the Senate of Canada, Government of Ontario, Ontario Chiefs of Police, and the City of Ottawa.

Recognizing Community Leaders
Starting in 2006, Jer's Vision began recognizing individuals and groups with the Youth Role Model of the Year award. The award recognizes persons who have done exceptional work to stop bullying, discrimination in their communities at their annual gala. Past recipients of the award include Rick Mercer, Jack Layton, Lori Taylor and Brandon Timmerman, Stephen Lewis, Brian Burke, Elder William Commanda, Libby Davies, Hedy Fry, Adamo Ruggiero, Matthew Good, Audrey Wolfe, and Sheila Copps.

The Gay Sweater

On March 24, 2015, the CCGSD launched The Gay Sweater. The campaign, aimed at reclaiming the phrase "that's so gay" by creating an actual gay object - namely a sweater knit from yarn made from 100% human hair donated by the LGBT community - was timed to coincide with Toronto Fashion Week. The Gay Sweater received widespread coverage and the YouTube video had 45,000 views in the first 48 hours.

See also

LGBT rights in Canada
List of LGBT rights organisations
International Day of Pink

References

External links
Canadian Centre for Gender & Sexual Diversity

Organizations established in 2005
Children's websites
Anti-bullying charities
Children's charities based in Canada
LGBT non-profit organizations in Canada